Marc Mitchell (born September 3, 1983) is a former American stock car racing driver. Mitchell competed in the NASCAR Busch Series and the NASCAR Camping World Truck Series. Mitchell was the 2001 Legend Car World Finals champion. He made his NASCAR Busch Series debut at the Milwaukee Mile in 2007, where he placed 20th. Mitchell competed in 19 NASCAR Truck Series races between 2007 and 2009, reaching the top 10 once.

Motorsports career results

NASCAR
(key) (Bold – Pole position awarded by qualifying time. Italics – Pole position earned by points standings or practice time. * – Most laps led.)

Busch Series

Camping World Truck Series

ARCA Re/Max Series
(key) (Bold – Pole position awarded by qualifying time. Italics – Pole position earned by points standings or practice time. * – Most laps led.)

References

External links
 

Living people
1983 births
NASCAR drivers
ARCA Menards Series drivers
Sportspeople from Tallahassee, Florida
Racing drivers from Florida